North Bengal Dental College & Hospital (NBDC&H) is a government dental college situated at Sushrutanagar, near Siliguri, Darjeeling, West Bengal. The college is recognized by Dental Council of India and is under the West Bengal University of Health Sciences.

History 
North Bengal Dental College was established on 28th December 1990 with 20 seats. The college was under the University of North Bengal until formation of The West Bengal University of Health Sciences, which was established in 2003. The first principal was Dr. Bimal Chandra Bera.

Course offered
This institution offers undergraduate course B.D.S . No postgraduate courses are offered by this dental college.

References

Dental colleges in India
Universities and colleges in Darjeeling district
Educational institutions established in 1990
1990 establishments in West Bengal